"Baby, Baby My Love's All for You" is a song by Deniece Williams, released as a single in October 1977 by Columbia Records. The song  reached No. 13 on the US Billboard Hot Soul Songs chart, No. 5 on the UK Blues & Soul Top British Soul Singles chart and No. 32 on the UK Pop Singles chart.

Overview
"Baby, Baby My Love's All for You" was produced by Maurice White and composed by Verdine White with Robert White. The song also appeared on Williams's 1977 album Song Bird.

Charts

References

1977 songs
1977 singles
Columbia Records singles
Deniece Williams songs
Songs written by Verdine White
Song recordings produced by Maurice White